Above the Title was a UK independent radio production company based in London. The company produced drama, music, comedy and documentary programmes, principally for BBC Radio. It is perhaps best known for making adaptations for radio of the last three books in Douglas Adams' "trilogy in five parts", The Hitchhiker's Guide to the Galaxy and the Clive Anderson legal discussion series Unreliable Evidence for BBC Radio 4.

The company's past works include adaptations of Agatha Christie mysteries, radio documentaries on The Kinks, Perry Como and Pink Floyd and the serialised drama An Everyday Story of Afghan Folk.

Above the Title is part of the publicly listed digital music and radio services company 7digital alongside sister production companies Unique and Smooth Operations.

See also
List of companies based in London

References

External links
 Official Site

Radio organisations in the United Kingdom
Mass media companies of the United Kingdom
Defunct companies based in London